Alois Kuhn (23 November 1910 - 12 February 1996) was a German ice hockey player who competed for the German national team at the 1936 Winter Olympics in Garmisch-Partenkirchen. He played club hockey for EV Füssen.

References

1910 births
1996 deaths
German ice hockey right wingers
Ice hockey players at the 1936 Winter Olympics
Olympic ice hockey players of Germany
Sportspeople from Füssen